Hogarty is an unincorporated community located in the towns of Harrison and Plover, Marathon County, Wisconsin, United States. The community was named for John Crump Hogarty, who opened a trading post in the area in 1850 and became the first postmaster when the post office opened in 1881.

References

Unincorporated communities in Marathon County, Wisconsin
Unincorporated communities in Wisconsin